Bastardo is a proper noun for at least two referents, each of them probably cognate with the common noun bastardo, meaning bastard in several Romance languages. It may also refer to:

Places
Fonte do Bastardo, a Portuguese parish of Praia da Vitória, Azores
Bastardo (Giano dell'Umbria), an Italian town in Perugia province, Umbria

Entertainment
Bastardo (film), a 2013 Tunisian film
"Bastardo", a single released by Charlotte Hatherley
¡Bastardos!, an album by Blues Traveler

Other
Bastardo (grape), a Portuguese variety of red grape
Bastardo, a variant of the burpee (exercise) which adds a pushup
Antonio Bastardo, a professional baseball player